Arkiv för Zoologi was a scientific journal on zoology, published by the Royal Swedish Academy of Sciences between 1903 and 1974. Prior to 1903, zoology articles were published in a supplement to the Transactions of the Academy. Arkiv för Zoologi was superseded by the journal Zoologica Scripta established in 1972.

References

External links 
 

Zoology journals
Royal Swedish Academy of Sciences
Publications established in 1903
Publications disestablished in 1974
Academic journals associated with learned and professional societies